Carlo Chiarlo (4 November 1881 – 21 January 1964) was an Italian cardinal of the Roman Catholic Church. He served as nuncio to several countries, mostly Latin American, and was elevated to the cardinalate in 1958.

Biography
Born in Pontremoli, Chiarlo studied at the seminary in Lucca and the Pontifical University of St. Thomas Aquinas (Angelicum) in Rome before being ordained to the priesthood on 28 May 1904. He then taught at the seminary and did pastoral work in Lucca until 1917. Chiarlo was secretary and later chargé d'affaires of the nunciature to Peru from 1917 to 1922, when he was named Auditor of the Polish nunciature.

He was raised to the rank of Privy Chamberlain of His Holiness on 26 May 1918 while secretary in Peru.

On 12 October 1928, Chiarlo was appointed Titular Archbishop of Amida by Pope Pius XI. He received his episcopal consecration on the following 12 November from Cardinal Pietro Gasparri, with Archbishop Giovanni Volpi and Bishop Theodor Kubina serving as co-consecrators, in the chapel of the Collegio Pio-Latinoamericano in Rome. He was named Nuncio to Bolivia on 12 November.

On 28 January 1932, Chiarlo was made Apostolic Internuncio to Central America, with responsibility as Nuncio to Costa Rica, Honduras, Nicaragua, El Salvador, and Panama, as well as Apostolic Delegate to Guatemala. His role was then modified on 30 September 1933 with the erection of nunciatures, leaving him Apostolic Nuncio to Costa Rica, Nicaragua, and Panama, with his role as Nuncio to El Salvador and Honduras and Delegate to Guatemala assigned to Albert Levame later that year.

Returning to Rome, he was charged with the special mission of assisting prisoners of World War II on 3 December 1941. He was named head of the pontifical mission to Germany in 1945.

He was appointed Nuncio to Brazil, where he would be a beloved figure, on 19 March 1946. He was replaced in Brazil by Armando Lombardi on 22 September 1954 and remained a nuncio at the disposition of the Secretariat of State.

Pope John XXIII created him cardinal-priest of S. Maria in Portico in the consistory of 15 December 1958. Cardinal Chiarlo lived long enough to attend only the first two sessions of the Second Vatican Council from 1962 to 1963, and serve as a cardinal elector in the 1963 papal conclave that selected Pope Paul VI.

He died in Lucca at age 82 and is buried in an urban cemetery there.

Notes

References

External links
Catholic-Hierarchy 
Cardinals of the Holy Roman Church

20th-century Italian cardinals
Pontifical University of Saint Thomas Aquinas alumni
Participants in the Second Vatican Council
20th-century Italian Roman Catholic titular archbishops
Pontifical Ecclesiastical Academy alumni
Apostolic Nuncios to Bolivia
Apostolic Nuncios to Brazil
Apostolic Nuncios to Costa Rica
Apostolic Nuncios to Guatemala
Apostolic Nuncios to Nicaragua
Apostolic Nuncios to Panama
Apostolic Nuncios to El Salvador
Apostolic Nuncios to Honduras
1881 births
1964 deaths
Cardinals created by Pope John XXIII
People from the Province of Massa-Carrara
Recipients of the Order of the White Eagle (Poland)